Ray Watts may refer to:
 Ray Watts (footballer) (1917–2008), Australian rules footballer 
 Ray Watts (singer) (1957–2000), reggae singer and songwriter
 Ray L. Watts (born 1953), president of the University of Alabama at Birmingham
 Ray E. Watts (1895–1969), American football, basketball and baseball coach